Ribautia derrana is a species of centipede in the Geophilidae family. It is endemic to Australia, and was first described in 1920 by American biologist Ralph Vary Chamberlin.
 The original description of this species is based on a specimen measuring 31 mm in length with 51 pairs of legs.

Distribution
The species occurs in eastern coastal Queensland. The type locality is Dana, near Brisbane.

Behaviour
The centipedes are solitary terrestrial predators that inhabit plant litter, soil and rotting wood.

References

 

 
derrana
Centipedes of Australia
Endemic fauna of Australia
Fauna of Queensland
Animals described in 1920
Taxa named by Ralph Vary Chamberlin